The Coal and Iron Police was a private police force in the US state of Pennsylvania that existed between 1865 and 1931. It was established by the Pennsylvania General Assembly but employed and paid by the various coal companies. The origins of the Coal and Iron Police begin in 1865. Law enforcement in Pennsylvania at that time (and until 1905) existed only on the county level or below; an elected sheriff was the primary law enforcement officer (for each county). The case was made by the coal and iron operators that they required additional protection of their property. Thus the Pennsylvania State Legislature passed State Act 228. This empowered the railroads to organize private police forces. In 1866, a supplement to the act was passed extending the privilege to "embrace all corporations, firms, or individuals, owning, leasing, or being in possession of any colliery, furnace, or rolling mill within this commonwealth". The 1866 supplement also stipulated that the words "coal and iron police" appear on their badges. A total of over 7,632 commissions were given for the Coal and Iron Police.

Strike breakers 

The first Coal and Iron Police were established in Schuylkill County, Pennsylvania, under the supervision of the Pinkerton Detective Agency. Although the Coal and Iron Police nominally existed solely to protect property, in practice the companies used them as strikebreakers. The coal miners called them "Cossacks" and "Yellow Dogs". For one dollar each, the state sold to the mine and steel mill owners commissions conferring police power upon whoever the owners selected. Common gunmen, hoodlums, and adventurers were often hired to fill these commissions and they served their own interests by causing the violence and terror that gave them office. The Coal and Iron Police worked with the Pinkertons, particularly with a labor spy by the name of James McParland, to suppress the Molly Maguires.

Beginning of the end

The end of the Coal and Iron Police began in 1902 during what became known as The Anthracite Coal Strike. It began May 15 and lasted until October 23. The strike led to violence throughout seven counties and caused a nationwide coal shortage, driving up the price of anthracite coal. The strike did not end until President Theodore Roosevelt intervened. In the aftermath of the strike, there was growing determination that peace and order should be maintained by regularly appointed and responsible officers employed by the public. This led to the formation of the Pennsylvania State Police on May 2, 1905, when Senate Bill 278 was signed into law by Governor Samuel W. Pennypacker. The stated purpose was to act as fire, forest, game and fish wardens, and to protect the farmers, but some observers felt that it really was to serve the interests of the coal and iron operators because the same legislation created a "trespassing offense" that wherever a warning sign was displayed a person could be arrested and fined ten dollars. This was seen as a direct assault on picketing. In August 1911 a Coal and Iron Policeman/Deputy Constable Edgar Rice of Coatesville, Pennsylvania, was shot and killed by Zachariah Walker; Walker was lynched by a mob a few days later.

However, the Coal and Iron Police continued to exist even after the establishment of the state police. Indeed, a July 25, 1922, article in the Johnstown Tribune noted that additional Coal and Iron Police were hired during the national coal miner's strike in 1922.

Michael Musmanno, in 1929 a Pennsylvania state legislator, fought to banish the Coal and Iron Police after they had beaten worker John Barkoski to death. The final disbandment was helped along by Musmanno's writing a short story based on the case, which was adapted into the 1935 film Black Fury.  Decades later Musmanno released a novel of the same name.

In 1931, then-Governor Gifford Pinchot refused to renew or issue new private police commissions, thereby effectively ending the industrial police system in Pennsylvania. The reasons for his act are not clear and may have included political payback for his defeat in a 1926 campaign by a candidate from Indiana County who had the strong support of the coal and steel operators, as a political gesture to the rising labor movement of the 1930s, out of personal disgust with the excesses of the Coal and Iron Police, or some combination thereof. His official statement indicates the latter, in reference to an assault perpetrated by a couple of Iron Policemen.

The brutality of the Coal and Iron Police forms the background to some sections in Dos Passos's U.S.A. trilogy, focusing on miners' struggles and strikes in Pennsylvania.  The Coal and Iron Police also feature in the Sherlock Holmes novel, The Valley of Fear, which is based loosely on the breaking of the Molly Maguires.

See also
 State Police of Crawford and Erie Counties
 Auxiliary police
 Railroad police
 Security police
 Special police
 Company police
 Murder of workers in labor disputes in the United States

References

Further reading

 Meyerhuber, Jr., Carl I. Less than Forever: The Rise and Decline of Union Solidarity in Western Pennsylvania, 1914-1948. Selingsgrove, Pa.: Susquehanna University Press, 1987. 
 Norwood, Stephen H. Strikebreaking and Intimidation: Mercenaries and Masculinity in Twentieth-Century America. Chapel Hill, N.C.: University of North Carolina Press, 2002. 

Government agencies established in 1865
1931 disestablishments in Pennsylvania
History of labor relations in the United States
Coal in the United States
Defunct law enforcement agencies of Pennsylvania
1865 establishments in Pennsylvania
Private police in the United States